Ang Latest (Filipino for "The Latest") was a Philippine showbiz oriented talk show broadcast by TV5 replacing Paparazzi, hosted by Amy Perez, Mr. Fu and Cristy Fermin together with co-host Lucy Torres-Gomez. The show airs every Saturdays at 11:30 pm on TV5 and also airs every Mondays to Fridays at 11:15pm as Ang Latest Up Late replacing Juicy!.

Hosts
 Amy Perez
 Mr. Fu
 Cristy Fermin
 Lucy Torres-Gomez
 Joey Reyes
 Shalala
 Divine Lee

See also
 List of programs broadcast by TV5 (Philippine TV network)

References

External links

 

TV5 (Philippine TV network) original programming
Entertainment news shows in the Philippines
2012 Philippine television series debuts
2013 Philippine television series endings
Philippine television talk shows
2010s television talk shows
Filipino-language television shows